Oriental Nights is a 1960 West German crime film directed by Heinz Paul and starring Marina Petrova, Pero Alexander and Karl Lieffen.

Cast
 Marina Petrova as Maryse
 Pero Alexander as Korff
 Karl Lieffen as Pierre
 Barbara Laage as Arlette
 Gerti Gordon as Stasi
 Reinhard Kolldehoff as Jemzeff
 Eduard Linkers as Tomaides
 Viktor Afritsch
 Rolf von Nauckhoff
 Mario del Marius as Dancer
 Hanita Hallan as Dancer
 Iban Sangare as Dancer
 Erika Nein as Dancer
 Angela Hartmann
 Al Hoosmann
 The Nilsen-Brothers as Singers

References

Bibliography
 Joachim Lembach. The standing of the German cinema in Great Britain after 1945. Edwin Mellen Press, 2003.

External links 
 

1960 films
1960 crime films
German crime films
West German films
1960s German-language films
Films directed by Heinz Paul
1960s German films